Parviz Koozehkanani, is a retired Iranian football player.

Club career 
He started his career with Taj SC and ended it with the same club in 1965, which a lifelong injury had caused his early retirement.

In 1957 he was transferred to 1. FC Köln then Bayer Leverkusen. His stay in Germany was shortened due to his desire to resume his career with the national team to take part at 1958 Asian Games.

In 1960, he moved to the United States where he spent 2 years.

International career 
Koozehkanani was a member of the Iran national football team from 1951–1962. He appeared in the 1951 and 1958 Asian Games.

Honours
Iran
Asian Games Silver medal: 1951

References

Iranian footballers
Iran international footballers
Association football forwards
Esteghlal F.C. players
Bayer 04 Leverkusen players
1. FC Köln players
Expatriate footballers in Germany
Iranian expatriate footballers
Living people
Asian Games silver medalists for Iran
Asian Games medalists in football
Footballers at the 1951 Asian Games
Medalists at the 1951 Asian Games
Footballers at the 1958 Asian Games
Year of birth missing (living people)